Nokia Xpress (also called Xpress Browser) was a mobile browser developed by Nokia and supported by Microsoft until the end of 2015. It came loaded by default with Series 40, Asha Platform and Nokia X Software Platform. It uses the Gecko rendering engine. On Nokia feature phones it was replaced by Opera browser in early 2015.

About
Nokia Xpress Browser uses intermediate Nokia proxy servers to optimize web pages based on the capabilities and screen size of the device. The proxy servers also compress data to reduce data transmission charges for the mobile user. The browser was released for Lumia devices in 2012.

Privacy
Like the Opera Mini, the Nokia Xpress browser decrypts and compresses HTTPS traffic, routing it through Nokia's own servers. This practice seeks to provide faster browsing for users of feature phones and smartphones with lower processing power (and thus lower bills for less mobile data usage). However, as pointed out by researcher Gaurang K. Pandya, this raises serious privacy concerns, because Nokia is essentially "performing Man In The Middle Attack for sensitive HTTPS traffic" and temporarily decrypting user data—which could be sensitive financial information, passwords. The company admitted to the technical details, but stated, "Claims that we would access complete unencrypted information are inaccurate". GigaOm criticized Nokia, which, unlike the Opera Mini, has failed to make it clear that HTTPS traffic will be decrypted during transit. It recommended that Nokia learn from Amazon's Silk browser, which leaves HTTPS traffic unperturbed.

User agent
The Xpress Browser reports the following user 
agents:

Nokia
Lumia, Nokia 311: Mozilla/5.0 (Series40; Nokia311/03.81; 
Profile/MIDP-2.1 Configuration/CLDC-1.1) Gecko/20100401 
S40OviBrowser/2.2.0.0.31
Nokia X3-02: Mozilla/5.0 (Series40; NokiaX3-02/le6.32; 
Profile/MIDP-2.1 Configuration/CLDC-1.1) Gecko/20100401 
S40OviBrowser/2.0.2.62.10
Nokia 225: Mozilla/5.0 (Series30Plus; Nokia225/20.10.11;
Profile/Series30Plus Configuration/Series30Plus) Gecko/20100401
S40OviBrowser/3.8.1.2.0612

See also
 Mobile browser
 List of web browsers
 Comparison of web browsers
 S60 browser
 Internet Explorer Mobile

References

External links
 XpressBrowser for Series 40
 Windows Phone page at Beta Labs
 Download for Windows Phone

Mobile web browsers
Nokia services